was a Japanese heavy metal band who specialized in metal covers of theme songs from classic and modern Japanese anime and tokusatsu television series.

They were composed of several luminaries of the Japanese metal scene, most notably vocalist Eizo Sakamoto, who has been involved off and on with Anthem as well as participating in various other projects including the pop rock group Nerima, the JAM Project, and a successful solo career where he also plays lead guitar as well as vocals.

As of 2006, the band is currently on indefinite hiatus.

Style 
Their music can be classified as speed metal and power metal with a very high level of musical virtuosity, especially on the guitarists' (initially She-Ja for the first four albums, then Syu from Animetal Marathon V to the present) and bassist Masaki's parts. Masaki, in particular from Animetal Marathon IV onward, has shown an intensely active and aggressive approach to his instrument with fluid soloing, manic slapping and popping, energetic fills, and crashing chords for punctuation. The albums are structured as nearly seamless barrages of short songs woven into well-structured medleys that sound as though the band simply enters the studio and lays down virtually the entire album from start to finish in one go, with occasional overdubs and breaks in the action here and there.

Part of the band's nostalgic factor is their incorporation of popular rock-metal instrumentals into some of the songs. For instance, their version of "Choujuu Sentai Liveman" is played to the tune of Judas Priest's "Breaking the Law".

The lyrics are almost entirely in Japanese with occasional lines of "Engrish", which may partly account for why they are virtually unknown outside Japan, except that they admittedly are playing to a very small niche market. For a short time, they incorporated Pink Lady member Mie into the band, hence the name change to "Animetal Lady", and recorded two albums with her distinctive and melodic vocals that are much more commercially accessible than the rest of the Animetal discography.

While they're known more for their covers, the band has a few original songs, including the ballad  from the Rurouni Kenshin film.

Animetal USA 

In 2011,  was formed as a tribute to Sakamoto's band, performing English-language metal covers of popular anime and tokusatsu themes. The band consisted of lead vocalist Michael Vescera, guitarist Chris Impellitteri, bassist Rudy Sarzo, and drummer Scott Travis. They released their self-titled debut album on October 12. A year later, Travis left the band to focus on touring with Judas Priest; he was replaced by Jon Dette before the band released their second album Animetal USA W on June 6.

Animetal the Second 

A project titled , centered around anonymous female vocalist Queen.M, was started in 2015 to continue the Animetal tradition. Its self-titled debut album was released on March 25 by Gr8! Records and features musicians such as Akira Takasaki and Masayoshi Yamashita of Loudness, Warren DeMartini, and George Lynch. It was followed up in April 2016 with Blizzard of Animetal the Second, which features Scotti Hill, Paul Gilbert, Richie Kotzen, Luke Takamura, and Saki. Animetal the Second made an appearance at Ozzfest Japan 2015.

Personnel

Final lineup 
Eizo Sakamoto – vocals (1996–2006)
Syu – guitar (2003–2006)
Masaki – bass (1997–2006)

Former members 
Katsuji – drums (1997–2006)
Mie – lead vocals in Animetal Lady (1997–1998, 2002)
Kouichi Seiyama – keyboards (1997–1998, 2002)
She-Ja – guitar (1997–2002)
Yasuhiro Umezawa – drums (1997–1998)

Guest members 
Yasufumi Shinozuka – guitar on "Animetal" (1996)
Yō Okamura – bass on "Animetal" (1996)
Devil Miyamoto – drum programming on "Animetal" (1996)
Take-Shit – bass on "This is Animetal" (1997)
Munetaka Higuchi – drums on "Animetal Summer" and  "Sentimetal" (1997)
Rei Atsumi – keyboards on "Animetal Lady Kenzan!" (1997) and Animetal Lady Marathon (1998)
Hiroyuki Namba – keyboards on "Towa no Mirai" (1997)
Shinki – drums on Animetal Lady Marathon and "Yuuki no Akashi" (1998)
Nov – vocals on "Ai o Torimodose!!" (2001)
Mitsuo Takeuchi – vocals on "Galactic Gale Baxinger" (2001)
Marty Friedman – lead guitar on one track on Animetal Lady Marathon II (2002)

Timeline

Discography 

 Animetal Marathon (1997)
 Animetal Marathon II (1998)
 Animetal Lady Marathon (1998)
 Animetal Marathon III (1998)
 Animetal Marathon IV (2001)
 Animetal Lady Marathon II (2002)
 Animetal Marathon V (2003)
 Animetal Marathon VI (2004)
 Animetal Marathon VII (2005)
 Decade of Bravehearts (2006)

References

External links 
  
  (Animetal Lady) 
  (Animetal the Second) 
 
 

Anime musical groups
Musical groups established in 1996
Musical groups disestablished in 2006
Japanese heavy metal musical groups
Japanese power metal musical groups